Zoltan Sarosy (August 23, 1906 – June 19, 2017) was a Hungarian-Canadian professional chess master, he was born in Budapest and won numerous tournaments in his native country before immigrating to Toronto in the early 1950s.

Early life
Sarosy was born in Budapest, Austria-Hungary, on August 23, 1906.

Tournaments
Sarosy won chess tournaments in several cities in Hungary including Nagykanizsa (1929), Pécs (1932), and Budapest (1934). During World War II he won the Hungarian Master Candidates Tournament in 1943. After the war, following a period in a refugee camp in West Germany, he moved to France in 1948. He drew a training match (2–2) with Alsace Champion Henri Sapin in 1950 and then emigrated to Canada, arriving in Halifax and then settling in Toronto. In Toronto he took up correspondence chess and was thrice Canadian Correspondence Champion (1967, 1972, 1981). In 2006 he was inducted into the Canadian Chess Hall of Fame. He was still actively playing chess at the age of 107.

Later life
At the end of World War II after having fled Hungary where he served as a military translator, and divorced his first wife after she refused to move to Canada. After divorcing his first wife, he married Hella Mällo (1930-1998), an Estonian immigrant, in Canada. On August 23, 2016, Sarosy became a supercentenarian, when he reached the age of 110 years, and at the time was the oldest known living man and fourth oldest known living person in Canada. Sarosy died on June 19, 2017, in Toronto, Canada.

References

Sources
 
 Berry, Jonathan, "Chess", The Globe and Mail, December 30, 2006, pg. R17
 Berry, J. "Chess", The Globe and Mail, September 16, 2006, pg. R25
 Berry, J. "Chess", The Globe and Mail, April 14, 2007, pg. R25

1906 births
2017 deaths
Hungarian chess players
Canadian chess players
Canadian supercentenarians
Sportspeople from Budapest
People from the Kingdom of Hungary
Canadian people of Hungarian descent
Hungarian emigrants to Canada
Men supercentenarians